The 2021 Coastal Carolina Chanticleers football team represented Coastal Carolina University during the 2021 NCAA Division I FBS football season. The Chanticleers were led by third-year head coach Jamey Chadwell and played their home games at Brooks Stadium. They competed as a member of the East Division of the Sun Belt Conference.

Previous season
In a season limited due to the ongoing COVID-19 pandemic, the Chanticleers finished the 2020 season 11–1, 8–0 in Sun Belt play to finish in first place in the East Division and shared the regular season conference championship with Louisiana. The Chanticleers received an invitation to the Cure Bowl, their first time postseason FBS bowl game. There they lost to No. 23 Liberty in overtime.  

The Chanticleers were ranked as high as No. 9 in the AP poll and No. 12 in the Coaches poll and College Football Playoff standings. The team notched wins against two top 25 teams and a win against a Power Five conference team.

Preseason

Recruiting class

|}
Source:

Award watch lists
Listed in the order that they were released

Preseason

Sources:

Sun Belt coaches poll
The Sun Belt coaches poll was released on July 20, 2021. The Chanticleers were picked to finish tied for first in the East Division and second overall in the conference.

Sun Belt Preseason All-Conference teams

Offense

1st team
Grayson McCall – Quarterback, RS-SO
Isaiah Likely – Tight End, SR
Jaivon Heiligh – Wide Receiver, SR

2nd team
Trey carter – Offensive Lineman, SR
Willie lampkin – Offensive Lineman, SO

Defense

1st team
Jeffrey Gunter – Defensive Lineman, RS-SR
C. J. Brewer – Defensive Lineman, SR
Silas kelly – Linebacker, SR
D'Jordan Strong – Defensive Back, SR

2nd team
Teddy gallagher – Linebacker, SR

Special teams

2nd teams
Massimo biscardi – Kicker, SR

Personnel

Schedule
The 2021 regular-season schedule consisted of 7 home and 5 away games. The Chanticleers traveled to Sun Belt foes Arkansas State, Appalachian State, Georgia Southern, and South Alabama. Coastal hosted Sun Belt foes Louisiana–Monroe, Troy, Georgia State, and Texas State.

The Chants hosted three of their four non-conference opponents at Brooks Stadium: The Citadel, from the NCAA Division I FCS Southern Conference; Kansas of the Big 12 Conference; and UMass, an FBS Independent. They traveled to Buffalo of the Mid-American Conference.

Rankings

Game summaries

The Citadel

Kansas

at Buffalo

UMass

Louisiana–Monroe

at Arkansas State

at Appalachian State

Troy

at Georgia Southern

Georgia State

Texas State

at South Alabama

vs. Northern Illinois (Cure Bowl)

References

Coastal Carolina
Coastal Carolina Chanticleers football seasons
Cure Bowl champion seasons
Coastal Carolina Chanticleers football